The Devil's Backbone is a 2001 gothic horror film directed by Guillermo del Toro, and written by del Toro, David Muñoz, and Antonio Trashorras.

The film is set in Spain, 1939, during the final year of the Spanish Civil War. It was released to positive reviews.

Plot
Casares, a doctor, and his friend's wife Carmen operate a small orphanage in a remote part of Spain during the Spanish Civil War. Helping the couple are Jacinto, the groundskeeper, and his fiancée Conchita, a teacher. Casares and Carmen support the Republican loyalists, and are hiding a large cache of gold being used to back the Republican treasury; the orphanage has also been subject to attacks from Francisco Franco's troops, and an inert bomb sits in the courtyard.

One day, an orphan named Carlos arrives with Ayala and Domínguez, two loyalists. Casares and Carmen take Carlos in, and he soon strikes up a friendship with Jaime, the orphanage bully, as well as Galvez and Owl. However, Carlos soon begins having visions of a mysterious entity, and hears stories about a child named Santi who went missing on the day the bomb was dropped in the courtyard. On his first night at the orphanage, Carlos is dared by Jaime to sneak to the kitchen for water after curfew, and Carlos counters by daring Jaime to go with him. The boys reach the kitchen, but Jaime hurries out after filling his pitcher, leaving Carlos alone. Carlos hears a whisper telling him that "many of you will die." Frightened, Carlos rushes outside, but is caught by Jacinto. The next morning, Casares asks who snuck out after curfew but Carlos claims he went alone. This, as well as Carlos saving Jaime from falling in a cistern, earns him Jaime's friendship.

Jacinto knows of the gold hidden at the orphanage, and uses his affair with Carmen as an opportunity to take her keys and search for the treasure. That night, the boys hear strange noises and Carlos decides to investigate. He sneaks out, and encounters a pale figure of a young boy with a bleeding wound on his head, which causes him to run back into the building. Later, after flipping through Jaime's sketchbook, Carlos finds a drawing of a ghostly figure labeled "Santi", leading him to suspect that Jaime knows more than the other boys.

Casares sees that Ayala has been captured by the nationalists. Fearing Ayala will soon be tortured into revealing the gold’s location at the orphanage, he convinces Carmen that they must evacuate the children immediately. Jacinto overhears the conversation and confronts Carmen, demanding the stash of gold and crassly bringing up their affair in front of Casares. Enraged, Casares points a gun at Jacinto and forces him to leave.

As the orphans and faculty prepare to leave, Conchita discovers Jacinto pouring gasoline around the kitchen. She shoots him in the arm after he mocks her, causing a furious Jacinto to start a fire before fleeing the building. Carmen and fellow teacher Alma attempt to put out the fire, but fail to prevent an explosion; Alma is killed by the blast, as are several of the children. Casares finds a mortally wounded Carmen inside the building, and tearfully stays with her as she dies. Casares decides to remain in the charred orphanage with the surviving children, arming himself for Jacinto's return.

The following night, Jaime reveals to Carlos the details of Santi's disappearance: Jaime and Santi had been collecting slugs at the cistern, when they spotted Jacinto attempting to open the safe where the gold was kept. Jaime managed to escape, but Jacinto cornered Santi and attempted to threaten him into keeping silent. In anger, Jacinto shoved Santi against a stone wall, giving him a severe head injury and sending him into shock. A panicked Jacinto then tied stones to Santi before sinking his body in the cistern. A terrified Jaime then ran into the courtyard, only to have the bomb land several feet from him moments later.

Jaime insists that he is no longer scared of Jacinto, and will kill him if he returns. Conchita attempts to walk to the nearest town for help when she encounters Jacinto and two associates driving back to the orphanage to claim the gold. Jacinto threatens her with a knife, telling her to apologize for shooting him, but she insults him instead, and he stabs her to death.

Carlos has a final encounter with Santi's ghost, who he is no longer afraid of after hearing the circumstances of his death. The ghost quietly demands that Carlos bring Jacinto to him.

Casares dies of his injuries as Jacinto and his associates reach the orphanage and imprison the orphans while they search for the gold. The two other men eventually grow impatient and leave, but Jacinto finds and takes the stash. Meanwhile, Jaime encourages the children to fight back, and they fashion weapons from sharpened sticks and broken glass. The ghost of Casares then comes to free them, unlocking the door, leaving behind a monogrammed handkerchief. The children attack Jacinto in the cellar, finally pushing him into the cistern where he had dumped Santi's body. Weighed down by the gold he was carrying, Jacinto struggles to resurface, but Santi's ghost appears from the depths and drags him to his death.

As the remaining children leave the orphanage and head to town, Casares' ghost watches them from the doorway.

Cast
 Fernando Tielve as Carlos, an orphan. He is described by del Toro in the DVD commentary as a force of innocence. Tielve had originally auditioned as an extra before del Toro decided to cast him as the lead. This was his film debut. Both Tielve and his co-star Iñigo Garcés had cameos as guerrilla soldiers in Pan's Labyrinth.
 Íñigo Garcés as Jaime, the orphanage bully who later befriends Carlos.
 Eduardo Noriega as Jacinto, the caretaker.
 Marisa Paredes as Carmen, the administrator of the orphanage.
 Federico Luppi as Dr. Casares, the orphanage doctor.
  as Santi, an orphan who becomes a ghost.
 Irene Visedo as Conchita, Jacinto's fiancée.

Production

It was independently produced by Agustín Almodóvar as an international co-production between Spain and Mexico, and was filmed in Madrid.

Del Toro wrote the first draft before writing his debut film Cronos. This "very different" version was set in the Mexican Revolution and focused not on a child's ghost but a "Christ with three arms". According to del Toro, and as drawn in his notebooks, there were many iterations of the story, some of which included antagonists who were a "doddering ... old man with a needle," a "desiccated" ghost with black eyes as a caretaker (instead of the living Jacinto who terrorizes the orphans), and "beings who are red from head to foot."

As mentioned in the "Spanish Gothic" interview on the DVD, the name of the movie was initially to be taken from the "Devil's Backbone" mountain range setting in Mexico; this was changed when the movie wound up being set in Spain. One scene showed jars of a liqueur the doctor owned, each containing spiced rum called “Limbo water”, preserving a fetus that died from spina bifida. The doctor said the drink was rumored to cure impotence and was sold to fund the school. This became the origin of the name.

As to motivation for the villain, according to the actor who portrayed him (Eduardo Noriega), Jacinto "suffered a lot when he was a child at this orphanage. Somebody probably treated him wickedly: this is his heritage. And then there is the brutalizing effect of the War." Noriega further notes that "What Guillermo did was to write a biography of Jacinto (which went into Jacinto's parents, what they did in life, and more) and gave it to me."

DDT Studios in Barcelona created the final version of the crying ghost (victim and avenger) Santi, with his temple that resembled cracked, aged porcelain.

Reception
The response was overwhelmingly positive, though it did not receive the critical success that Pan's Labyrinth would in 2006.  On Rotten Tomatoes the film has a 92% rating based on 119 reviews, with an average rating of 7.6 out of 10. The website's critical consensus reads, "Creepily atmospheric and haunting, The Devil's Backbone is both a potent ghost story and an intelligent political allegory." It also has a weighted average score of 78 out of 100 on Metacritic based on 30 critic reviews, indicating "generally favorable reviews".

Roger Ebert awarded the film 3 stars out of 4 and compared it favorably to The Others, another ghost story released later in the same year. Christopher Varney, of Film Threat, claimed: "That 'The Devil's Backbone' makes any sense at all – with its many, swirling plotlines – seems like a little wonder." A. O. Scott, of The New York Times gave the film a positive review, and claimed that "The director, Guillermo del Toro, balances dread with tenderness, and refracts the terror and sadness of the time through the eyes of a young boy, who only half-understands what he is witnessing."

Steve Biodrowski from Cinefantastique Online described the film as "rich in texture, characterization and themes. Besides being genuinely creepy, it is also surprisingly moving. It is, quite probably (and this is not a back-handed compliment) the saddest horror movie ever made." He also praised the performances as well as the special effects, which he declared as "some of the best ever seen, easily matching work from the best US facilities; in fact, in at least one way they are even better."

The film was ranked at number 61 on Bravo's list 100 Scariest Movie Moments for its various scenes in which the ghost is seen. Bloody Disgusting ranked the film at number 18 in their list Top 20 Horror Films of the Decade, with the article calling the film "elegant and deeply-felt... it’s alternately a gut-wrenching portrait of childhood in a time of war and a skin-crawling, evocative nightmare."

See also 
 List of Spanish films of 2001
 List of ghost films

References

External links
 
 
 
 

2001 horror films
2001 fantasy films
2000s thriller films
Spanish supernatural horror films
Spanish thriller films
Mexican supernatural horror films
Supernatural thriller films
Spanish dark fantasy films
Gothic horror films
Spanish haunted house films
Spanish Civil War films
Films set in 1939
Films shot in Madrid
Films shot in Spain
Films directed by Guillermo del Toro
Films with screenplays by Guillermo del Toro
Films scored by Javier Navarrete
2000s Spanish-language films
Films produced by Guillermo del Toro
Films produced by Agustín Almodóvar
El Deseo films
2000s Spanish films
2000s Mexican films